National heritage can refer to:
 Cultural heritage of a nation
 National heritage site
 National Heritage (film), a 1981 Spanish comedy
 National Heritage (organisation), a British organisation, see John Letts

See also
 National Heritage Act, legislation of Malaysia and the United Kingdom